Dexter Avenue Baptist Church is a Baptist church in Montgomery, Alabama, United States, affiliated with the Progressive National Baptist Convention.  The church was designated as a National Historic Landmark in 1974 because of its importance in the civil rights movement and American history. In 1978 the official name was changed to the Dexter Avenue King Memorial Baptist Church, in memory of Dr. Martin Luther King Jr., who was pastor there and helped organize the Montgomery bus boycott in 1955 during the civil rights era. The church is located steps away from the Alabama State Capitol.

On January 1, 2008, the US Government submitted the church to UNESCO as part of an envisaged future World Heritage Site nomination, because of this important history. It is on the UNESCO "Tentative List of World Heritage Sites".

History
The Dexter Avenue Baptist Church congregation was organized in 1877 by freedmen and free people of color. It was first known as the Second Colored Baptist Church. The church trustees paid $270 on January 30, 1879, for a lot at the corner of what is now Dexter Avenue and Decatur Street.  The first church building was a small wood-frame building. The congregation began construction of a new building in 1883; the brick building was not completed until 1889. The church began serving the broader African American community on October 3, 1887, when it hosted the first registration of students for Alabama State University, a historically black college.

In 1899, William H. McAlpine became pastor; he was a cofounder of Selma University. Vernon Johns, an early leader of the Civil Rights Movement, served as pastor from 1947 to 1952. He was succeeded by Dr. Martin Luther King Jr., who was pastor of the church from 1954 to 1960. He organized the 1955 Montgomery bus boycott from his basement office.

Near the church is the former Dexter Parsonage, which served as home to twelve pastors of the church between 1920 and 1992. It is now operated as the Dexter Parsonage Museum, interpreting church history. The church was added, on its own merits, to the National Register of Historic Places in 1982.

Gallery

See also
List of National Historic Landmarks in Alabama
List of Baptist churches in Alabama

References

External links

Dexter Avenue King Memorial Baptist Church

National Register of Historic Places in Montgomery, Alabama
National Historic Landmarks in Alabama
Churches on the National Register of Historic Places in Alabama
Religious organizations established in 1877
Baptist churches in Alabama
Churches in Montgomery, Alabama
Montgomery bus boycott
African-American history in Montgomery, Alabama
Gothic Revival church buildings in Alabama
Italianate architecture in Alabama
Civil rights movement museums
1877 establishments in Alabama
Italianate church buildings in the United States